The  Public Health Service Smallpox Eradication Campaign Ribbon is a decoration of the United States Public Health Service presented to members of the United States Public Health Service Commissioned Officer Corps and to members of any other uniformed service of the United States

Criteria
The PHS Smallpox Eradication Campaign Ribbon was awarded to officers who has served 9- days or more cumulative service in the Centers for Disease Control Bureau of Smallpox Eradication or Smallpox Laboratory, in the World Health Organization's (WHO) Smallpox Eradication Program, or in a temporary duty assignment in a smallpox effort abroad. The service must have occurred between January 1, 1966 and October 26, 1977.

See also
 Awards and decorations of the Public Health Service
 Awards and decorations of the United States government

References

United States Department of Health and Human Services
Achievement Medal